WJYK is a Contemporary Christian and Religious formatted broadcast radio station licensed to Chase City, Virginia, serving Chase City and Northern Mecklenburg County, Virginia.  WJYK is owned and operated by Battaglia Communications, Inc.

References

External links

1959 establishments in Virginia
Contemporary Christian radio stations in the United States
Radio stations established in 1959
JYK
JYK
Mecklenburg County, Virginia